Basim Bello is the longest serving mayor of Tel Keppe District, Iraq. An adherent of the Chaldean Catholic Church, Bello was a member of the Assyrian Democratic Movement, until he split from the party in 2014.

In August 2017, he was deposed as mayor but was reinstated in August 2018.

Facing demographic changes in his district, Bello advocated for religious minorities by saying in December 2019, “Our territories used to have a Christian trace, but that is not the case anymore” and “If the constitution is amended, our rights and protection must be included.”

References

Mayors of Tel Keppe
Living people
Assyrian Democratic Movement politicians
Year of birth missing (living people)
Place of birth missing (living people)
Chaldean Catholics